Shaban Jafari (19 August 1921 – 21 March 2006), often known as Shaban the Brainless, was a political activist and practitioner of varzesh-e bastani. A controversial figure in Iranian politics, he was instrumental in overthrowing Prime Minister Mohammad Mossadegh's government in the 1953 Iranian coup d'état. Following the coup, Mohammad Reza Pahlavi, also known as the Shah seized power and governed as a dictator. Over time, the Shah's regime lost both popular support and confidence. By the 1970s, longstanding grievances against the Shah resulted in the Iranian Revolution which deposed him. Jafari, whose connection to the 1953 coup made him a target for the new Iranian government, fled to the United States where he remained until his death in 2006.

Biography 
Shaban Jafari, often known as Shaban the Brainless, was a political activist who often resorted to thuggish tactics to scare his opponents into submission. He was also a practitioner of Iranian traditional sport (varzesh-e bastani) and was a frequent at Zoorkhaneh. During the 1953 Iranian coup d'état, he was often regarded as a leader of street fights for the Shah and against the popular Mossadegh. Jafari's critics claimed that he received money from the British and American intelligence agencies. However he rebuffed these accusations and maintained that he was in prison during the coup and could not have participated in it. Following the successful coup against Mosadegh the Shah implemented several mechanism to secure his regime, the most notable being the SAVAK which was a secret police that spied on Iranian citizens. The Iranian government committed multiple instances of human rights abuses during this time. It was these human rights abuses coupled with the Shah's efforts to westernize the traditional Iran that began his downfall.

Support of the Shah collapsed by the late 1970s and Iranians began public demonstrations against the Shah's regime. Initially the Shah was successful in repressing these measures largely using the SAVAK to prevent dissent. However these measures proved ineffective by the end of 1978 the Shah was no longer able to maintain his grasp on power and the Iranian Revolution was underway. The following year saw the Shah make a desperate escape from Iran which he did on 16 January. With the Shah now out of the country, a new Islamic government led by Ruhollah Khomeini rose to power and began prosecuting individuals who had connections to the Shah. Jafari was identified as a criminal for his involvement in the coup that brought the Shah to power. Khomeini's provisional government attempted prosecute him however it was unable to locate Jafari as he fled Iran and relocated to the United States where he was given political asylum. His later life was relatively calm and he died in Santa Monica in 2006. He is buried in Westwood Memorial Park, Westwood, Los Angeles County, California, USA. A book of his memoirs was published in the United States by the Iranian-American journalist Homa Sarshar which became very popular among the migrant Iranians in other countries. It was especially popular to the Iranians who fled from the country, after the Islamic Revolution.

References

1921 births
2006 deaths
Exiles of the Iranian Revolution in the United States
Iranian emigrants to the United States
Iranian male athletes
20th-century Iranian politicians
Politicians from Tehran